The 2017–18 season was Chornomorets Odesa's 23rd season in the top Ukrainian football league. Chornomorets competed in Premier League and Ukrainian Cup. After finishing at 11th place in Premier League, Chornomorets lost to FC Poltava in play-offs and was relegated to First League. However on 21 June 2018 FC Poltava announce the dissolution of the club. On 3 June 2018 Chornomorets was officially approved by FFU as 2018–19 Ukrainian Premier League participant.

Players

Squad information

Transfers

In

Out

Pre-season and friendlies

Competitions

Overall

Premier League

League table

Results summary

Results by round

Matches

Relegation round

Ukrainian Cup

Statistics

Appearances and goals

|-
! colspan=14 style=background:#dcdcdc; text-align:center| Goalkeepers

|-
! colspan=14 style=background:#dcdcdc; text-align:center| Defenders

|-
! colspan=14 style=background:#dcdcdc; text-align:center| Midfielders 

|-
! colspan=14 style=background:#dcdcdc; text-align:center| Forwards

|-
! colspan=14 style=background:#dcdcdc; text-align:center| Players transferred out during the season

Last updated: 27 May 2018

Goalscorers

Last updated: 27 May 2018

Clean sheets

Last updated: 27 May 2018

Disciplinary record

Last updated: 27 May 2018

References

External links 
Official website

Chornomorets
FC Chornomorets Odesa seasons